The Bureau of Police Research and Development (BPR&D), was set up on 28 August 1970 in furtherance of the objective of the Government of India for the modernisation of police forces. It has evolved as a multifaceted, consultancy organisation. At present it has 4 divisions – Research, Development, Training and Correctional Administration.

Functions 
Functions of the Bureau of Police Research and Development (BPR&D) are different for each of the four divisions and are as follows:

Research Division 
 Analysis and study of crime and problems of general nature affecting the police, e.g.,
 Trends and causes of crime.
 Prevention of crime-preventive measures, their effectiveness and relationship with crime.
 Organisation, strength, administration, methods, procedures and techniques of the police forces and their modernisation, police act and manuals.
 Improvements in methods of investigation, utility, and results of introducing scientific aids and punishment.
 Inadequacy of laws.
 Juvenile delinquency.
 Police Uniform, badges, medals, decorations, colours, and flags, police drill, warrant of procedure etc.
 Assistance of Police Research programmes in States and Union Territories, processing and coordination of research projects, sponsoring extra mutal research.
 Work relating to Standing Committee on Police Research.
 Police Science Congress & other conferences and seminars relating to study of police problems.
 Participation in social defence and crime prevention programmes.
 Participation in the work of the United Nations in the field of prevention of crime and treatment of offenders.
 Maintenance of all India statistics of crime.
 Statistical analysis of trends of crime.
 Documentation relating to Police Science and Criminology.
 Publication of:
 Police Research & Development Journal
 Crime in India
 Indian Police Journal
 Accidental Deaths and Suicides
 Research Reports and News Letters
 Reports, Reviews, other journals and books relating to matters connected with police work.

Modernisation Division 
 Review of the performance of various types of equipment used by the police forces in India and development of new equipment in the following fields:
 Arms and Ammunition
 Riot Control Equipment
 Traffic Control Equipment
 Police Transport
 Miscellaneous scientific equipment and scientific aids to investigation
 Liaison with the National laboratories, Indian Ordnance Factories, various scientific organisations and institutions and public and private sector undertakings in the above fields, coordination of development programmes and stimulating indigenous production of police equipment.
 Application of computer technology in various fields of police work.
 Police publicity and police publicity files, police weeks and parades.
 Work relating to Police Research & Development Advisory Council and its Standing Committees, other than on police research.

Training Division 
 To review from time to time the arrangements for police training and the needs of the country in this field in the changing social conditions and the introduction of scientific techniques in training and in police work and to formulate and coordinate training policies and programmes in the field of police administration and management.
 Central Detective Training Schools, Kolkata, Hyderabad & Chandigarh.To evaluate training programmes with a view to securing such standardisation and uniformity in the training arrangements including courses, syllabi and curricula for various ranks in the States and Union Territories as may be desirable and to suggest modifications and improvements that may be considered necessary from time to time to meet new challenges and problems.
 To help devise new refresher, promotion, specialist and orientation courses considered necessary for the different grades and kinds of police officers.
 Work relating to the establishment of the Central Medico Legal Institute and the Central Traffic Institute.
 To prepare, in coordination with the police training institutions, standard manuals, textbooks, pamphlets, lecture notes, case studies, practical exercises and other educative literature for use in these institutions.
 To distribute relevant literature to Inspectors General/DIG(Training) in the States for circulation to officers in order to familiarise them with training concepts and to strengthen training consciousness among the higher ranks.
 To standardise equipment for training and training aids and to arrange for their production and supply to the various training institutions.
 To create and maintain a circulating library of films for the use of various police training institutions.
 To assist in the training of police officers of various ranks at appropriate non-police institutions inside and outside India.
 To organise the annual Symposium of the Heads of Police Training Institutions and short Seminars on various aspects of Police training.
 To suggest the establishment of new training institutions under the Centre as necessary from time to time.
 To act as a clearing house for information relating to Syllabi, methods of training, teaching aids, training programmes and literature on various aspects of police work etc. from India and abroad.
 To help in the development of libraries in the Central and State Police training institutions.
 To liaise with the Directorate of Training of the Department of Personnel in relation inter-alia to training aids projects and fellowships under the United Nations Development Programme, UNESCO & Colombo Plan etc.

Correctional Administration 
 Analysis and study of prison statistics and problems of general nature affecting Prison Administration.
 Assimilation and dissemination of relevant information to the States in the field of Correctional Administration.
 Coordination of Research Studies conducted by RICAs and other Academic/Research Institutes in Correctional Administration and to frame guidelines for conduct of research studies/surveys in consultation with the State Governments.
 To review training programmes keeping in view the changing social conditions, introduction of new scientific techniques and other related aspects.
 To prepare uniform Training Module including course, syllabi, curriculum, etc. For providing training at various levels to the Prison staff in the field of Correctional Administration.
 Publication of reports, newsletters, bulletins and preparation of Audio Visual aids, etc. in the field of Correctional Administration.
 To set up an Advisory Committee to guide the work relating to Correctional Administration.

See also

 Crime reporting and tracking
 Call 112
 Criminal record
 Crime and Criminal Tracking Network and Systems (CCTNS)
 Law enforcement in India
 National Crime Records Bureau (NCRB)
 Sex offender registry (SOR)
 United Nations Office on Drugs and Crime (UNODC)

 Other police related
 Indian Police Foundation and Institute
 Sardar Vallabhbhai Patel National Police Academy

References 

Research in India
1970 establishments in Delhi
Government agencies established in 1970
Law enforcement in India